Bulinus cernicus is a species of small air-breathing freshwater snail, an aquatic pulmonate gastropod mollusk in the family Planorbidae, the ramshorn snails and their allies.

This species is found in Mauritius and Reunion Island.

References

External links
 Molecular phylogenetic investigations of Bulinus (Gastropoda_Planorbidae) in Lake Malawi with comments on the topological incongruence between DNA loci/links/54ae4bd00cf2828b29fcce46.pdf A Jørgensen, LVG Jørgensen, TK Kristense, Molecular phylogenetic investigations of Bulinus (Gastropoda: Planorbidae) in Lake Malawi with comments on the topological incongruence between DNA loci; Zoologica Scripta, 36, 6, November 2007, pp577–585

Bulinus
Gastropods described in 1867
Taxonomy articles created by Polbot